Azie Tesfai is an American actress. She is known for her television roles, including Jane the Virgin and Supergirl.

Early life and education 
Azalech (Azie) Tesfai was born and raised in Los Angeles, California, the daughter of Eritrean immigrants who grew up in Ethiopia. She is an only child. Tesfai received a degree in business administration from UC Berkeley. While at Berkeley she began attending auditions and acting classes.

Career 
Tesfai's first role was Cherry Milton in Wicked Wicked Games on MyNetworkTV, where she appeared in 30 episodes over two seasons. She has appeared in Melrose Place, Law & Order: SVU, Franklin & Bash and Royal Pains. In 2014 she was cast as recurring detective Nadine Hanson in the CW's Jane the Virgin. She appeared in season 3 of Silicon Valley in 2016.

She was cast as Kelly Olsen, the sister of DC Comics character James Olsen (Mehcad Brooks), on the fourth season of The CW series Supergirl. Prior to her debut appearance in the fourth season, it was announced that Tesfai would be promoted to series regular for the fifth season. She co-wrote episode 12 of the sixth and final season ("Blind Spots"), making her the first Arrowverse actor to receive a writing credit on an Arrowverse series.

Fortuned Culture 
Tesfai founded jewelry company Fortuned Culture in Los Angeles. Proceeds from sales help children in developing countries like Mexico, Ethiopia and Cambodia.

Filmography

References 

University of California alumni
African-American actresses
American people of Eritrean descent
Living people
American television actresses
Actresses from Los Angeles
Year of birth missing (living people)
21st-century American women